Josip Elic (born Joseph Elich Jr.; March 10, 1921 – October 21, 2019) was an American actor. He is best known for his role as Bancini in the film One Flew Over the Cuckoo's Nest (1975).

Early life
Elic was born in Butte, Montana, the son of Croatian immigrants, Martha and Joseph Elich. One of several children, including siblings John and Helen, he grew up in the East Side neighborhood known as "Cabbage Patch". At age 16, he began work in a Montana copper mine, before later joining the U.S. Navy. In 1945, following his service, and a brief stint on Wall Street, Elic relocated to New York City to pursue an acting career, using the G.I. Bill to enroll in acting school. At the age of 30, he officially changed his name in homage to his Croatian roots. Initially entering show business by building sets for an Upstate Connecticut summer stock company, he eventually began appearing in off-Broadway productions, including Threepenny Opera in 1954, alongside Bea Arthur and John Astin.

Career
While off-Broadway shows and burlesque were amongst Elic's first forays into acting, in 1956, the 6-foot-3-inch Montanan landed his first television role on the NBC anthology series Kraft Television Theatre, opposite Rance Howard and Joe Mantell, in an episode directed by William A. Graham. While numerous minor television and film roles soon followed, Elic was also notable for his commercial appearances, becoming one of the first character actors to headline television ads, a role traditionally reserved for Hollywood's leading men. He later became more nationally recognized after two appearances on The Twilight Zone, including in "The Obsolete Man" with Burgess Meredith. His breakout role however came when asked to appear as confused mental patient, Bancini, in Miloš Forman's 1975 classic, One Flew Over the Cuckoo's Nest. Despite having few lines in the film, his major scene came in the form of an improvisation by Jack Nicholson for the patient's basketball game. In his words, Elic remembered the scene's development as:

Although his film and television career began to dwindle by the late seventies, Elic's final on-screen performance was in 1989 for the Ridley Scott action thriller, Black Rain. Regardless of his disappearance from television and theater screens however, he continued to maintain a strong presence in the acting community of New York, and would regularly make appearances at conventions to meet fans.

Personal life and death
Suffering a fall in his New York apartment, Elic briefly stayed at the home of his longtime friend, actress Lee Meredith, and her husband, Bert, before moving into the Brookdale Senior Living assisted-living residence in Paramus, New Jersey.

In October 2019, at the age of 98, Elic died of complications from his fall.

Filmography

Film

Television

References

External links

1921 births
2019 deaths
20th-century American male actors
American male film actors
American male television actors
American people of Croatian descent
Male actors from Montana
Male actors from Butte, Montana
Military personnel from Montana
United States Navy personnel of World War II